Wadeana is a genus of fungi in the division Ascomycota. Its to other taxa within the division is unknown (incertae sedis), and it has not yet been placed with certainty into any class, order, or family.

It is named after Edward Arthur Wade.

See also
 List of Ascomycota genera incertae sedis

References

External links
Index Fungorum

Ascomycota enigmatic taxa
Lichen genera
Taxa named by Brian John Coppins
Taxa named by Peter Wilfred James